Panos Markovits (alternate spelling Panos Markovic) (5 May 1925 – 17 August 2012) was a Greek football coach and player.

Career
He was born in Drama, Macedonia (Greece) in 1925, but grew up in Thessaloniki. He played football for PAOK from 1945 to 1951 and then transitioned from player to coach.

In 2010, he was given an award by the President of the Republic Demetris Christofias, for his contributions to sport in Cyprus.

References

1925 births
2012 deaths
Greek footballers
Greek football managers
Greece national football team managers
Pierikos F.C. managers
Iraklis Thessaloniki F.C. managers
Panionios F.C. managers
APOEL FC managers
Panachaiki F.C. managers
Apollon Pontou FC managers
Association football midfielders
Footballers from Drama, Greece
Greek expatriate football managers